Vasile Chitaru (5 January 1959 – 5 December 2003) was a Romanian footballer who played as a forward.

Club career
Vasile Chitaru, nicknamed "Zira" was born on 5 January 1959 in Bacău. He made his Divizia A debut on 19 May 1974, playing for SC Bacău at the age of 15 years, 4 months and 14 days in a 3–0 home victory against Jiul Petroșani. In 1976, Chitaru went to play for Dinamo București, where in his only season spent at the club, he won the league title, contributing with 7 matches played in the campaign, also playing his only game in a European competition, a 0–0 against AC Milan in the 1976–77 UEFA Cup. He returned to play for SC Bacău for a few years and played his last three years of his career at Partizanul Bacău, Foresta Fălticeni and Proletarul Bacău, retiring in 1969. Throughout his life, Chitaru struggled with alcoholism, committing suicide in December 2003 by jumping from his apartment balcony which was on the fourth floor.

Honours
SC Bacău
Divizia B: 1974–75
Dinamo București
Divizia A: 1976–77

References

1959 births
2003 deaths
Romanian footballers
Association football forwards
Romania youth international footballers
Romania under-21 international footballers
Liga I players
FCM Bacău players
FC Dinamo București players
Sportspeople from Bacău
Suicides by jumping in Romania
2003 suicides